The Tour Silex 2 (Silex 2 Tower in English, usually presented in the form Silex²) is an office skyscraper which rises 23 levels in the district of La Part-Dieu in the 3rd arrondissement of Lyon, France. The tower rises 129 meters high. It is currently under construction and will be delivered in 2021.

The new building will offer 30,700 square meters of office space over 23 floors. The tower is therefore a continuation of the Silex 1 project, a small office building completed and delivered on May 11, 2017.

In 2021, the Belgian group Solvay, one of the leaders in world chemicals, will move into the tower and should occupy 9,000 m2 of offices, on eight levels.

See also
 Tour Incity
 Tour Oxygène
 Sustainable architecture

References

External links 
Official Website

3rd arrondissement of Lyon
Office buildings completed in 2021
Skyscrapers in Lyon
Skyscraper office buildings in France
21st-century architecture in France